Ali Abeid Amani Karume (born May 24, 1950) is a Tanzanian diplomat, who is Tanzanian Ambassador to Italy and Dean of Tanzania Ambassadors. He is the son of Zanzibar's first president, Sheikh Abeid Amani Karume and a member of the Chama Cha Mapinduzi (CCM) party since its inception in 1977.

Biography
Karume was born in Zanzibar.

He was schooled at Tumekuja Secondary School and later at the Lumumba College in Zanzibar until 1969. He started his career as Special Assistant to the General Manager of ZSTC Zanzibar (1969–1970). He was later promoted to Managing Director of ZSTC where he held the position for two years from 1970 to 1972. From 1972 to 1978, Karume held the position of Deputy Minister, Ministry of Trade and Industry in the Zanzibar Government. In 1978, Karume took a leave of absence for advanced studies in the U.S.A.

In 1984, Karume graduated from Columbia University, then entered government service.

A year after graduation, Karume joined the Tanzania Foreign Service and began eight years of service as Minister Plenipotentiary in Brussels, Belgium (1985–1989) and as Deputy Ambassador  to the United States of America (U.S.A) in Washington DC, U.S.A (1989–1993).

He was Ambassador and Director for Europe and Americas Department at the Ministry of Foreign Affairs and International Cooperation in Dar es Salaam, Tanzania from 1993 to 1996. He was then appointed by President Benjamin William Mkapa as Ambassador to Belgium, Netherlands and Luxembourg (Benelux) and The European Union (E.U) where he served from 1996 to 2002. Subsequently, until 2006, Karume served as Ambassador to Germany, Switzerland and Poland with concurrent accreditation to the Holy See- Vatican, Austria, Czech Republic, Slovakia, Hungary, Romania and Bulgaria.

In July 2006, Ambassador Karume was appointed by President Kikwete as Ambassador to Italy, Turkey, Greece, Slovenia, Cyprus and Malta.

References

1950 births
Living people
Chama Cha Mapinduzi politicians
Tanzanian diplomats
Ambassadors of Tanzania to the European Union
Ambassadors of Tanzania to Belgium
Ambassadors of Tanzania to Luxembourg
Ambassadors of Tanzania to the Netherlands
Ambassadors of Tanzania to Germany
Ambassadors of Tanzania to Switzerland
Ambassadors of Tanzania to Poland
Ambassadors of Tanzania to the Holy See
Ambassadors of Tanzania to Austria
Ambassadors of Tanzania to the Czech Republic
Ambassadors of Tanzania to Slovakia
Ambassadors of Tanzania to Hungary
Ambassadors of Tanzania to Romania
Ambassadors of Tanzania to Bulgaria
Ambassadors of Tanzania to Greece
Ambassadors of Tanzania to Slovenia
Ambassadors of Tanzania to Croatia
Ambassadors of Tanzania to Italy
High Commissioners of Tanzania to Cyprus
Tumekuja Secondary School alumni
Columbia University alumni